Afandiyev (masculine) or Afandiyeva (feminine) is an Azerbaijani surname. Notable people with the surname include:

Elchin Afandiyev (born 1943), Azerbaijani writer, academic and politician
Ilyas Afandiyev (1914–1996), Azerbaijani Soviet writer
Sultan Majid Afandiyev (1887–1938), Azerbaijani revolutionary and politician
Narmin Afandiyeva (born 1993), Azerbaijani chemist

Azerbaijani-language surnames